His Lordship's Last Will ( and also known as His Grace's Last Testament) is a 1919 Swedish silent drama film directed by Victor Sjöström.

Cast
 Karl Mantzius - His Lordship
 Carl Browallius - Wickberg
 Greta Almroth - Blenda
 Tyra Dørum - Mrs. Enberg
 Georg Blickingberg - Toni
 Semmy Friedmann - Jacob
 Augusta Lindberg - Mrs. Hyltenius
 Sture Baude - Roger Hyltenius
 Nils Ahrén - Mayor Bjoerner
 Josua Bengtsson - Jonsson
 Sigurd Wallén - School Inspector
 Carl Borin - Teacher
 Emil Fjellström - Mailman
 Olof Ås - Farmhand
 Georg Ahl - Per Hyltenius

References

External links

1919 films
1910s Swedish-language films
Swedish black-and-white films
1919 drama films
Swedish silent films
Films directed by Victor Sjöström
Swedish drama films
Silent drama films